Akutsu is a Japanese surname. Notable people with the surname include:

Chie Akutsu (born 1984), Japanese field hockey player
, Japanese shogi player
, Japanese long-distance runner
, Japanese synchronized swimmer
, Japanese politician

See also
 Akutsu Rapid Attack Fortress, a type of opening strategy in shogi
 Akutsu, a character in the anime series Yu-Gi-Oh! 5D
 Kaette Kudasai! Akutsu-san, a Japanese manga series

Japanese-language surnames